The following highways are numbered 980:

Philippines
 N980 highway (Philippines)

United States